Changsha Concert Hall is located at Beichen Delta in Kaifu District of Changsha, Hunan. It is adjacent to the Changsha Museum, Changsha Planning Exhibition Hall and Changsha Library.

History
The foundation stone for Changsha Concert Hall was laid on August 21, 2006. In December 2007, the construction project of Changsha Concert Hall was officially launched. On December 28, 2015, Changsha Concert Hall held its first performance.

Performance venues and facilities
Changsha Concert Hall has four floors. The first floor is an actor and logistics office, VIP and other functional rooms. The second floor is leisure and exhibition space for visitors to visit. The third floor is the audience entrance, which can overlook the whole concert hall interior scene. The fourth floor is the concert hall. The exterior wall pattern of Changsha Concert Hall is based on a famous song Xiaoxiang Shuiyun written by a Southern Song dynasty (1127–1279) violinist, composer and educator named Guo Mian, when he visited Hengyang.

Concert Hall
 Symphony Hall: Consists of 1446 seats, it is the main part.
 Multi-functional Concert Hall: Consists of 490 seats, it is an important part.
 Indoor Concert Hall: Consists of 298 seats, it is an important part.

Transportation
 Take subway Line 1 to get off at Beichen Delta Station.
 Take bus No. 11 or 106 to Liangguan Yiting Bus Stop

References

External links

 

Buildings and structures in Changsha
2015 establishments in China
Concert halls in China
Tourist attractions in Changsha